Clinton Township is an inactive township in Clinton County, in the U.S. state of Missouri.

Clinton Township was erected in 1871, taking its name from Clinton County.

References

Townships in Missouri
Townships in Clinton County, Missouri